Irandil Ondru is a 1988 Tamil-language film directed by V. Azhagappan, starring Ramki, Nadhiya and Raghuvaran. It was released on 4 March 1988.

Plot

Cast 
Ramki
Nadiya
Raghuvaran
Madhuri
Jaishankar
Rajeev
S. S. Chandran
Senthil

Soundtrack 
Soundtrack was composed by Ilaiyaraaja.

Release 
The film was initially denied a certificate by the Central Board of Film Certification for portraying "police force in a bad light".

References

External links 
 

1980s Tamil-language films
1988 films
Films directed by V. Azhagappan
Films scored by Ilaiyaraaja